Than Sina is a Cambodian politician. He was elected to represent Kampot Province in the National Assembly of Cambodia in 2003.

References

Members of the National Assembly (Cambodia)
Living people
Year of birth missing (living people)
Place of birth missing (living people)
21st-century Cambodian politicians